The Russian News Agency TASS (or Information agency of Russia), abbreviated TASS, is a major Russian state-owned news agency founded in 1904. TASS is the largest Russian news agency and one of the largest news agencies worldwide.

TASS is registered as a Federal State Unitary Enterprise, owned by the Government of Russia. Headquartered in Moscow, TASS has 70 offices in Russia and in the Commonwealth of Independent States (CIS), as well as 68 bureaus around the world.

In Soviet times, it was named the Telegraph Agency of the Soviet Union and was the central agency for news collection and distribution for all Soviet newspapers, radio and television stations. After the dissolution of the Soviet Union, the agency was renamed Information Telegraph Agency of Russia (ITAR-TASS) in 1992, but regained the simpler TASS name in 2014.

History

1902: TTA, SPTA, PTA, ROSTA 
The origin of TASS dates back to December 1902 when it began operations as the Commercial Telegraph Agency (TTA, Torgovo-Telegrafnoe Agentstvo) under the Ministry of Finance, with Torgovo-Promyshlennaya Gazeta's staff being the main supplier of journalists. As the demand for non-business began during the first battles of the Russo-Japanese War in February 1904, the agency had to change its name to the St. Petersburg Telegraph Agency (SPTA). As there was no change of headquarters and almost no change in its staff and function, it was a mere rebranding.

In August 1914, one day after St. Petersburg was renamed Petrograd, SPTA was renamed the Petrograd Telegraph Agency (PTA). It was seized by Bolsheviks in November 1917 and by December was renamed as the Central Information Agency of the Soviet Russian Council of People's Commissars. On 7 September 1918, the presidium renamed PTA and the Press bureau into the Russian Telegraph Agency (ROSTA), which became "the central information agency of the whole Russian Socialist Federative Soviet Republic".

1925: TASS 

In July 1925 the Telegraph Agency of the Soviet Union (Телеграфное агентство Советского Союза, Telegrafnoye agentstvo Sovetskogo Soyuza, TASS) was established by a decree of the Presidium of the Supreme Soviet, and took over the duties of the ROSTA as the country's central information agency. TASS enjoyed "exclusive right to gather and distribute information outside the Soviet Union, as well as the right to distribute foreign and domestic information within the Soviet Union, and manage the news agencies of the Soviet republics". Official state information was delivered as the TASS Report (Soobshchyeniye TASS).

TASS included affiliated news agencies in all 14 Soviet republics in addition to Russia: RATAU (Ukrainian SSR, now Ukrinform), BelTA (Byelorussian SSR), ETA (Estonian SSR), Latinform (Latvian SSR, now LETA), ELTA (Lithuanian SSR), ATEM (Moldavian SSR, now Moldpres), Armenpress (Armenian SSR), Gruzinform (Georgian SSR), Azerinform (Azerbaijan SSR, now AZERTAC), UzTAG (Uzbek SSR, now UzA), KazTAG (Kazakh SSR, now Kazinform), KyrTAG (Kyrgyz SSR, now Kabar), Turkmeninform (Turkmen SSR, now TDH) and TajikTA (Tajik SSR, now Khovar). Over the history other affiliates existed, e.g. KarelfinTAG for the Karelo-Finnish SSR.  In addition to producing reports for general consumption, TASS produced packages of content for non-public use.  Western news reports and potentially embarrassing domestic news would be compiled daily into a collection known as "White Tass," and particularly important news would be compiled into a smaller collection known as "Red Tass." These collections were made available only to journalistic and political leaders, and to top journalists and political leaders, respectively.

In 1961 Ria Novosti was created to supplement TASS, mainly in foreign reporting and human-interest stories. After 1971, TASS was elevated to the status of State Committee at the Government of the Soviet Union.

The agency was frequently used as a front organization by the Soviet intelligence agencies, such as the NKVD (later KGB) and Main Intelligence Directorate, with TASS employees serving as informants. In 1959, Alexander Alexeyev was dispatched to Cuba on a fact-finding mission, ostensibly working for TASS. Former Georgetown University professor James David Atkinson stated that TASS was an "effective propaganda medium" but that it concentrated "more heavily on espionage than on other activities." TASS frequently served as a vector for Soviet active measures.

1992: ITAR-TASS 
In January 1992, following the dissolution of the Soviet Union, a Presidential Decree signed by Boris Yeltsin re-defined status of TASS and renamed it the Information Telegraph Agency of Russia. In May 1994 The Russian Government adopted a resolution "On approval of the Charter of the Information Telegraph Agency of Russia", under which it operates as a central government news agency. The TASS acronym was, by this point, well-recognized around the world and so was retained after being redefined as the Telegraph agency of communication and messages. The agency as a whole was referred to as "ITAR-TASS".

In September 2014 the agency regained its former name as Russian News Agency TASS.

Organization 

TASS is registered as a Federal State Unitary Enterprise, owned by the Government of Russia. Headquartered in Moscow, TASS has 70 offices in Russia and in the Commonwealth of Independent States (CIS), as well as 68 bureaus around the world.

TASS press center 
TASS multi-media press center is a communication floor in the heart of Moscow. Every year it hosts some 300 events featuring high-ranking Russian officials, foreign heads of state, leaders of main political parties, representatives of the world of arts and culture, scientists and sporting personalities as well as managers of Russian and foreign business enterprises. TASS press centers also operate in St. Petersburg, Yekaterinburg and Novosibirsk.

TASS is a media partner of high-profile conferences, forums and exhibitions in Russia and abroad. The agency organized the first News Agencies World Congress (NAWC) in 2004.

TASS building 
TASS is headquartered in a building in the Soviet brutalist style built in 1977. In November 2021, an association of Russian architects criticized plans by Moscow city authorities to renovate the building without due regard for the preservation of its historic appearance.

Controversies and criticisms 
TASS has been cited as a source of disinformation as part of Russian influence operations.

2022 Russian invasion of Ukraine

 On 27 February 2022, "under the circumstances of the new media regulation enforced by the Russian government, which is heavily restricting media freedom", the European Alliance of News Agencies (EANA) unanimously decided to suspend TASS as "not being able to provide unbiased news", pending an exclusion decision.

 In March 2022, Getty Images, after "monitoring Russian state news agency TASS closely since Russia’s invasion of Ukraine" decided to end its partnership with TASS for what it said was violating editorial policy.

As of March 2022, examples of propagation of disinformation in relation to the 2022 Russian invasion of Ukraine are as follows:

 TASS falsely claimed that Ukrainian President Volodymyr Zelenskyy fled Kyiv following the invasion and also that he had surrendered. Zelenskyy used social media to post statements, videos and photos to counter this Russian disinformation.

 TASS made unsubstantiated claims that Ukraine was making a nuclear dirty bomb.

 TASS published unsubstantiated claims that "Ukrainian nationalists" were responsible for Ukrainian civilians not being able to leave the city of Mariupol while the city was besieged and bombed by the Russian military.

Directors of TASS 

M. Fedorov (1902–1904)
Pavel Miller (1904–1906)
S. S. Trubachev (1906-1907)
Alexander Gris (1907—1910)
O.-F. I. Lamkert (1910–1917)
Leonid Stark (1917–1918)
Lev Sosnovsky (1918–1919)
Platon Kerzhentsev (1919–1921)
Nikolay I. Smirnov (1921) 
Iosif Goldenberg (1921–1922) 
Jacob Doletzky (1922–1925)
A. A. Yablonsky (1925–1930)
 Yakov Khavinson (1937–43)
 Nikolai G. Palgunov (1943–60)
 Dmitry P. Goryunov (1960–67)
 Sergey Lapin (1967–70)
 Leonid Zamyatin (1970–78)
 Vladimir Khatuntsev (1978–79)
 Sergei A. Losev (1979–88)
 Leonid Kravchenko (1988–90)
 Lev Spiridonov (1990–91)
 Vitaly Ignatenko (1991–2012)
 Sergei Mikhailov (2012–present)

Notable journalists
 Ștefan Foriș, Romanian communist correspondent
 Vsevolod Kukushkin, ice hockey and sports correspondent (22 years)

See also 

 Propaganda in the Russian Federation
 Eastern Bloc media and propaganda
 Itar-Tass Russian News Agency v. Russian Kurier, Inc.

References

External links 

 
 

1902 establishments in the Russian Empire
1925 establishments in the Soviet Union
1992 establishments in Russia
Federal State Unitary Enterprises of Russia
News agencies based in Russia
Mass media companies of the Soviet Union
Companies based in Moscow
Mass media companies established in 1902
State media
Government-owned companies of Russia
Russian propaganda organizations